Christine Athena Horner is an American plastic surgeon, author, and activist for the prevention of breast cancer through holistic and alternative medicine methods. She is regarded as an expert on the subject of breast cancer. She appears frequently on television and speaks on radio to promote breast cancer prevention methods including lifestyle choices, vaccines, dietary choices such as eating less red meat and less sugar and reducing alcohol consumption, getting adequate sleep, and having better relationships. Her book Waking the Warrior Goddess discussed her ideas about breast cancer prevention. She was instrumental in a five-year-long public relations campaign to make insurance companies pay for breast reconstruction surgery following mastectomies by making it a federal law. She is certified with the National Board of Surgery and the National Board of Plastic Surgery.

Publications
 Waking the Warrior Goddess: Dr. Christine Horner's Program to Protect Against & Fight Breast Cancer
 Radiant Health, Ageless Beauty: Dr. Christine Horner's 30-Day Program to Extraordinary Health, Beauty, and Longevity
 The breast reconstruction advocacy project: One woman can make a difference

References

External links
 Christine Horner website

Living people
American plastic surgeons
American health activists
American medical writers
Women medical writers
1957 births